The Dr. Rafael Belloso Chacin University is a private university in Maracaibo, Zulia State, and one of the largest in Venezuela. The university was founded by its founding principal and superior council president, Oscar Belloso Medina in 1989.

It has approximately 40.000 students in undergraduate, graduate and other courses offered by this university and these are divided into 5 faculties from which they derive 9 schools that are taught in 17 runs and 25 graduate programs. It also has a line of media which are: TV URBE, a television station dedicated to the university; URBE 96.3fm, radio station 96.3 FM frequency for the state of Zulia, and an official web portal.

History

Foundation 
The university was founded on 5 October 1989 in honor of Dr. Rafael Belloso Chacin, MD founder and rector of the university. It started academic activities on 26 March 1990 with 567 students and 100 teachers.

Faculties 
On 5 October 1995, six years after the foundation of the city, he joined the Faculty of Law and Political Sciences with the School of Law and the Faculty of Administrative Sciences adds two new degrees: Accounting and Industrial Relations.

By November 1996, the Graduate Student Day, marks the final entry to the super information highway with the operation of the Internet.

Faculties 
Rafael Belloso Chacin University has 5 faculties, 9 schools and a total of 17 races:

References

External links 
Rafael Belloso Chacin University (Official website)
Rafael Belloso Chacin University at Facebook
URBE at Twitter
URBE Internacional
Campus URBE Web

Universities in Venezuela
Buildings and structures in Maracaibo
Educational institutions established in 1989
1989 establishments in Venezuela